Prasophyllum stellatum, commonly known as the Ben Lomond leek orchid, is a species of orchid endemic to Tasmania. It has a single tubular, dark green leaf and up to twenty greenish-brown to brownish flowers with a white labellum. It is only known from two disjunct populations, at Ben Lomond and near Deloraine.

Description
The edges of the upturned part of the labellum have crinkled edges and there is a greenish-yellow, fleshy, raised callus in its centre extending just past the bend. Flowering occurs from January to March.

Taxonomy and naming
Prasophyllum stellatum was first formally described in 1998 by David Jones from a specimen collected on Ben Lomond and the description was published in Australian Orchid Research. The specific epithet (stellatum) is a Latin word meaning "starry" or "starred" referring to the widely spreading petals and sepals.

Distribution and habitat
The Ben Lomond leek orchid is only known from two disjunct populations, one from private property near Storys Creek on Ben Lomond and the other in state forest at Cluan Tiers near Deloraine. It grows in forest with a shrub or grassy understorey.

Conservation
The population of P. stellatum has been estimated as about 70 in 2011. It is classed as "Endangered" under the Tasmanian Threatened Species Protection Act 1995 and as Critically Endangered under the Commonwealth Government Environment Protection and Biodiversity Conservation Act 1999 (EPBC) Act. The main threats to the population are forestry activities, inappropriate disturbance and inappropriate fire regimes.

References

External links 
 

stellatum
Flora of Tasmania
Endemic orchids of Australia
Plants described in 1998